Sacred Heart Catholic School is a mixed Roman Catholic secondary school and sixth form located in the Camberwell area of the London Borough of Southwark, England.

History
The school was converted to academy status in November 2012, and was previously a voluntary aided school administered by Southwark London Borough Council. Today the school is administered by the Roman Catholic Archdiocese of Southwark, but it continues to coordinate with Southwark London Borough Council for admissions.

In July 2012 temporarily Sacred Heart Catholic School relocated to a site on Trafalgar Street in Walworth while the original school was entirely rebuilt. The temporary site in Walworth is a new school campus developed from the buildings of a Victorian board school. Sacred Heart Catholic School relocated back to its original site in September 2014, and the campus in Walworth opened as University Academy of Engineering South Bank, a new secondary school for the area.

Notable former pupils

Constance Briscoe, disgraced barrister convicted of perverting the course of justice
Jordon Ibe, professional footballer
Martin McDonagh, film director
Giggs, rapper
Rapman, rapper

References

External links
Sacred Heart Catholic School official website

Secondary schools in the London Borough of Southwark
Catholic secondary schools in the Archdiocese of Southwark
Academies in the London Borough of Southwark
Educational institutions established in 1959
1959 establishments in England